The Sri Lankan Christmas tree is the world’s tallest artificial Christmas tree.

The cone-shaped tree is a steel-and-wire frame made from scrap metal and wood, and covered by plastic netting. It is decorated with approximately one million natural pine cones painted gold, green, red and silver colors. It has 600,000 LED bulbs which illuminate the tree at night. The tree cost 12 million Sri Lankan rupees (about US$80,000). The tree was constructed by 150 employees of the Sri Lankan Ministry of Ports and Shipping with support from other parties.

Construction work began in August 2016 but was abandoned in the first week of December after the Sri Lankan Catholic Church criticised it as "waste of money", and added "Construction work should be abandoned. Christmas is an occasion for sharing funds with the needy, not to waste money on lavishness... The market economy is using religion as a tool for selling Christmas."

Later, work on the tree recommenced after a meeting with Catholic Cardinal Malcolm Ranjith, the archbishop of Colombo. A  Santa Claus with a sled was placed near the tree.

Comparison 
Comparison of Sri Lankan Christmas tree with some other structures as follows:

Current status 
The tree had several criticisms apart from the Catholic Church. It did not have enough ornaments and firs. When compared with the tree that was built in Guangzhou, Sri Lankan tree failed to have green synthetic foliage. Also, it gave complete visibility of its internal frames or structure. The shape of the tree did not give enough appeal as a traditional Christmas tree, but rather resembled the shape a rocket. It was dismantled in January 2017. The tree is recorded by Guinness World Records in December 2017.

References

External links 
 Politics of the Christmas Tree, The Daily Mirror article.
 

Individual Christmas trees
Artificial Christmas trees
2016 establishments in Sri Lanka
Christmas in Sri Lanka
Guinness World Records
World record holders